The blue crayfish is Procambarus alleni, of which an electric blue morph is common in aquaria.

Blue crayfish may also refer to:
Cherax quadricarinatus -  tropical blue crayfish, or blue lobster, also common in aquaria
Cambarus monongalensis - Blue or Mononghela crayfish
Euastacus sulcatus - Blue or Lamington crayfish, from Australia

Also, three North American burrowing crayfish have 'blue' in their common name:
Cambarus cymatilis - Conasauga blue burrower
Cambarus harti - Piedmont blue burrower
Cambarus loughmani - Blue Teays mudbug

See also
 Blue lobster (disambiguation)

Animal common name disambiguation pages